Lacombe may refer to:

Places
 Lacombe, Alberta, Canada
 Lacombe County, Alberta, Canada
 Lacombe, Louisiana, United States
 Lacombe, Aude, France

People
 Albert Lacombe (1827–1916), oblate missionary to the Cree and Blackfoot
 Bernard Lacombe (born 1952), French football (soccer) player
 Brigitte Lacombe (born 1950), French photographer
 Claire Lacombe (1765–?), French actress and revolutionary
 Emile Henry Lacombe (1846–1924), American judge
 François Lacombe (born 1948), Canadian ice hockey player
 Georges Lacombe (painter) (1868–1916), French sculptor and painter
 Georges Lacombe (film director) (1902–1990) French film director and writer
 Grégory Lacombe (born 1982), French football (soccer) player
 Guy Lacombe (born 1955), French football (soccer) player
 Jackson LaCombe (born 2001), American ice hockey player
 Louis Lacombe (1818–1884), French pianist and composer
 Mathieu Lacombe, Canadian politician
 Michel Lacombe (born 1973), Canadian comic artist
 Normand Lacombe (born 1964), Canadian ice hockey player

Other uses
 Lacombe (pig), a breed of domestic pig
 Combe (disambiguation)